The 2002/03 FIS Nordic Combined World Cup was the 20th world cup season, a combination of ski jumping and cross-country skiing organized by FIS. It started on 29 Nov 2002 in Kuusamo, Finland and ended on 15 March 2003 in Lahti, Finland.

Calendar

Men

Standings

Overall 

Standings after 15 events.

Sprint 

Standings after 9 events.

Warsteiner Grand Prix 

Standings after 1 event.

Nations Cup 

Standings after 15 events.

References

External links
FIS Nordic Combined World Cup 2002/03 

2002 in Nordic combined
2003 in Nordic combined
FIS Nordic Combined World Cup